Eugene Julius (Jules) Soligny (1833 - January 10, 1901) was an American silversmith, best known for his repoussé and chasing work for Tiffany & Co. Soligny was born in Paris and studied with Léonard Morel-Ladeuil before emigrating to the U.S. in 1856. He was working for Tiffany by 1859, and by 1867 some of his Tiffany work is signed with his initials. He is credited with at least one US patent (173510 for embossing and chasing metal). His work is collected in the Art Institute of Chicago and Metropolitan Museum of Art.

References 
 Augustus Saint-Gaudens in the Metropolitan Museum of Art, Thayer Tolles, Metropolitan Museum of Art, 2009, pages 11, 62–63.
 American Silver in the Art Institute of Chicago, Art Institute of Chicago, Yale University Press, 2016, pages 147–148.
 Magnificent Tiffany silver, John Loring, Harry N. Abrams, 2001, pages 112, 119, 121.
 Tiffany timepieces, John Loring, Harry N. Abrams, 2004.
 "The Bryant Vase", Metropolitan Museum of Art.
 ""Night": An American Silver, Copper, Iron And Gold Allegorical Plaque, Tiffany & Co., New York, Signed By Eugene J. Soligny, circa 1875", Sotheby's.

American silversmiths
1833 births
1901 deaths